USS LST-480 was an  built for the United States Navy used in the Asiatic-Pacific Theater during World War II.

Construction
LST-480 was laid down on 31 August 1942, under Maritime Commission (MARCOM) contract, MC hull 1000, by Kaiser Shipyards, Yard No. 4, Richmond, California; launched on 29 October 1942; and commissioned on 3 May 1943.

World War II Pacific Theatre operations 
During World War II, LST-480 was assigned to the Asiatic-Pacific theater and participated in the following operations:
 Gilbert Islands operation: Capture and occupation of Gilbert Islands, 13 November to 8 December 1943.
 Marshall Islands operation: Occupation of Kwajalein and Majuro Atolls, 29 January to 8 February 1944.

Sinking

On 21 May 1944, LST-480 and at least 28 to 33 other LSTs were gathered near Waipio peninsula, in Pearl Harbors West Loch, loading ammunition and supplies in preparation for the invasion of Saipan.

At 15:08, an explosion onboard , which may have originated near , caused a chain reaction that would eventually sink LST-480, LST-353, and four other LSTs. At least two other LSTs were severely damaged and 163 sailors were killed with another 396 wounded.

While the other ships were removed and sunk at sea, the wreck of LST-480 can still be seen in the West Loch.

Awards
LST-480 earned two battle stars for World War II service.

Notes 

Citations

Bibliography 

Online resources

Further reading

External links

 

World War II amphibious warfare vessels of the United States
Ships built in Richmond, California
1942 ships
LST-1-class tank landing ships of the United States Navy
Ships sunk by non-combat internal explosions
Maritime incidents in May 1944
Shipwrecks of Hawaii
S3-M2-K2 ships